Mount Cleveland may refer to the following places in the United States:

 Mount Cleveland (Alaska), or Cleveland Volcano, on Chuginadak Island, Alaska
 Mount Cleveland, Skagway, Alaska, near Mount Carmack
 Mount Cleveland (Montana), in Glacier National Park
 Mount Cleveland, near Bethlehem, New Hampshire
 Mount Cleveland (Vermont), in the Green Mountains